Oleamide is an organic compound with the formula . It is the amide derived from the fatty acid oleic acid. It is a colorless waxy solid and occurs in nature. Sometimes labeled as a fatty acid primary amide (FAPA), it is biosynthesized from N-oleoylglycine.

Biochemical and medical aspects
In terms of natural occurrence, oleamide was first detected in human plasma.  It was later shown to accumulate in the cerebrospinal fluid during sleep deprivation and induces sleep in animals.

It has been considered as a potential treatment for mood and sleep disorders, as well as cannabinoid-regulated depression.

In terms of its sleep inducing effects, it is speculated that oleamide interacts with multiple neurotransmitter systems. Some in-vitro studies show that the cis enantomer of oleamide is an agnoist for the cannabinoid receptor CB-1 with an affinity around 8 micromolar. However, given oleamide's relatively low affinity for CB-1 and uncertainty about the concentration and biological role of oleamide in-vivo, it has been argued that it is premature to classify oleamide as an endocannabinoid. At larger doses oleamide can lower the body temperature of mice by about 2 degrees, with the effect lasting about two hours. The mechanism for this remains unknown.

Oleamide is rapidly metabolized by fatty acid amide hydrolase (FAAH), the same enzyme that metabolizes anandamide. It has been postulated that some effects of oleamide are caused by increased concentrations of anandamide brought about through the inhibition of FAAH.

Other occurrences
Synthetic oleamide has a variety of industrial uses including as a slip agent, a lubricant, and a corrosion inhibitor.

Oleamide was found to be leaking out of polypropylene plastics in laboratory experiments, affecting experimental results. Since polypropylene is used in a wide number of food containers such as those for yogurt, the problem is being studied.

Oleamide is "one of the most frequent non-cannabinoid ingredients associated with Spice products." Analysis of 44 products synthetic cannabinoid revealed oleamide in 7 of the products tested.

See also 
 Anandamide
 Fatty acid amide hydrolase
 Virodhamine

References 

Eicosanoids
Endocannabinoids
Fatty acid amides
Hypnotics
Lipids